Formose Mendy may refer to:
Formose Mendy (footballer, born 1989), Bissau-Guinean football winger
Formose Mendy (footballer, born 1993), French football centre-back
Formose Mendy (footballer, born 2001), Senegalese football defender